The 2021 North Dakota State Bison football team represented the North Dakota State University in the 2021 NCAA Division I FCS football season. The Bison competed as members of the Missouri Valley Football Conference and were led by third-year head coach Matt Entz. They played their home games at Fargodome in Fargo, North Dakota.

The Bison finished their regular season with a 10–1 record (7–1 in conference), losing only to South Dakota State. They were seeded second in the FCS postseason tournament and received a first-round bye; they then defeated Southern Illinois, East Tennessee State, and James Madison to reach the championship game. The Bison completed their season by defeating Montana State on January 8 in Frisco, Texas, to capture the program's ninth FCS title in 11 seasons.

Schedule

Game summaries

Regular season

Albany

Valparaiso

Towson

North Dakota

Northern Iowa

Illinois State

Missouri State

Indiana State

South Dakota State

Youngstown State

South Dakota

NCAA Division I Playoffs

Southern Illinois (second round)

East Tennessee State (quarterfinal)

James Madison (semifinal)

Montana State (National Championship)

Roster

References

North Dakota State
North Dakota State Bison football seasons
NCAA Division I Football Champions
Missouri Valley Football Conference champion seasons
2021 NCAA Division I FCS playoff participants
North Dakota State Bison football